Kamaluddin Ahmed (15 August 1930 – 1 September 2018) was an Indian politician. He was a leader of the Indian National Congress political party till 2000, when he left the party and joined the Bharatiya Janata Party. He was the union minister of state, civil supplies and public distribution and Minister of State, Commerce in Government of India from June 1991 to September 1994.

Born in Warangal in 1930, Ahmed studied at Osmania University. He was first elected to Lok Sabha in 1980 from Warangal constituency in Andhra Pradesh state. He was re-elected to the 9th, 10th and 11th Lok Sabha from Hanamkonda in Andhra Pradesh. He died on 1 September 2018 due to natural causes.

References 

 Ex-minister Kamaluddin joins BJP

1930 births
2018 deaths
India MPs 1980–1984
India MPs 1989–1991
India MPs 1991–1996
India MPs 1996–1997
Indian National Congress politicians from Telangana
Bharatiya Janata Party politicians from Telangana
Lok Sabha members from Andhra Pradesh
People from Hanamkonda district